Phanerozela polydora is a moth of the Heliozelidae family. It was described by Edward Meyrick in 1921. It is found in Brazil.

References

Moths described in 1921
Heliozelidae
Moths of South America